USS Sloat may refer to the following ships of the United States Navy:

 , a destroyer commissioned in 1920 and decommissioned in 1930
 , a destroyer escort commissioned in 1943 and decommissioned in 1947

United States Navy ship names